Apisalome Degei is a Fijian former professional rugby league footballer who represented Fiji in the 1995 World Cup.

Playing career
Degei played two matches at the 1995 World Cup.

Degei played for the side that represented the Fiji National Rugby League Competition in a test match against Australia in 1996 as part of the Super League war.

In 2007 he played in a rugby union sevens tournament in Western Sydney.

References

Living people
Fijian rugby league players
Fiji national rugby league team players
Rugby league second-rows
I-Taukei Fijian people
Year of birth missing (living people)